Actibacterium lipolyticum is a Gram-negative and aerobic bacterium from the genus Actibacterium which has been isolated from the Jeju island in Korea.

References

Rhodobacteraceae
Bacteria described in 2015